David López Nadales (born 22 January 1986 in Zaragoza, Aragon), known as Fonsi, is a Spanish professional footballer who plays as a defender for CD Sariñena.

Honours
 Top Assist Super League Greece: Runner-up 2017–18 (8 Assists)

External links
 
 
 

1986 births
Living people
Footballers from Zaragoza
Spanish footballers
Association football defenders
Segunda División B players
Tercera División players
Real Zaragoza B players
CD Teruel footballers
SD Ejea players
CD Sariñena players
Liga I players
AFC Săgeata Năvodari players
Super League Greece players
PAS Giannina F.C. players
Apollon Smyrnis F.C. players
Spanish expatriate footballers
Expatriate footballers in Romania
Expatriate footballers in Greece
Spanish expatriate sportspeople in Romania
Spanish expatriate sportspeople in Greece